Phillips Callbeck ( – January 28, 1790) was a merchant, lawyer and political figure in St. John's Island (later Prince Edward Island). He served as administrator for the island from 1775 to 1780.

Callbeck is believed to have been born and educated in Ireland. He arrived on the island from England around 1770 and was named to the first legislative council by Governor Walter Patterson. He was named attorney general and probate judge in the same year. He also operated a mill and owned a store.

During the American Revolution, Callbeck was taken prisoner by New England privateers in the Raid on Charlottetown (1775), shortly after being named colonial administrator during Patterson's absence. He was released and returned to the island by May 1776. After Patterson's return, Callbeck supported the seizure and sale of several townships for arrears. He ran unsuccessfully for a seat in the provincial assembly in 1784; he was named speaker for the assembly in 1788. After criminal charges were brought against Patterson in London, Callbeck was removed from office in 1789. He died in Charlottetown in 1790.

His grandson Henry Callbeck later served in the provincial assembly. Catherine Callbeck who served as premier of Prince Edward Island, and as a member of the Senate of Canada is also a direct descendant of Phillips Callbeck.

External links
 

American Revolutionary War prisoners of war held by the United States
1744 births
1790 deaths
Irish emigrants to pre-Confederation Prince Edward Island
Members of the Legislative Assembly of Prince Edward Island
Speakers of the Legislative Assembly of Prince Edward Island
Colony of Prince Edward Island judges
Attorneys General of the Colony of Prince Edward Island